YHBOYS was a Chinese boy group announced by Yuehua Entertainment in 2017. They debuted in 2017. The group consists of the leader Zhang Junyi and members Guo Dianjia, Zhang Minghao, Liu Guanyi, Zhang Enshuo, Sun Jiakai and Li Linma. The group's concept is to empower fans to participate in the growth of the members from the moment of their debut, while the members pursue their careers in both singing and acting.

Members 
He is the group leader. 
He is one of the group's dancers.
He is one of the lead singers in the group.
He is also one of the lead singers in the group.
He is one of the dancers in the group.
He is in charge of cuteness in the group.
He is one of the group's dancers.

History

Pre-debut 
Guanyi was a child actor prior to joining Yuehua and has participated in multiple TV dramas, web-movies and commercials since 2009.

Junyi was a participant of a CCTV reality TV show " (Wildest Summer Vacation)" in 2015 and Beijing TV's "(Music Masters' Class)" in 2016.

Minghao made his first public appearance as a child judge for Anhui TV’s " (Fighting! Fantastic Baby)" program in 2015 and has since participated in many variety shows and movies prior to joining Yuehua.

Linma was a dancer prior to joining Yuehua. In 2016, he participated in UNIQ's Yibo's opening performance for Hunan TV's Day Day Up.

On January 24, 2017 the group's information was announced on their official weibo account along with the first member of the group, Minghao. A new member was announced every Tuesday and Friday until the final member, Jia Kai was announced on February 14, 2017.

On February 15, 2017 YHBOYS released their first digital single " (The World Ahead)".

On March 27, 2017 they followed up with their second digital single " (Dream Fighting)".

On April 9, 2017 YHBOYS made their first live performance at the 17th Annual Top Chinese Music Awards.

On April 17, 2017 they released their third digital single " (Sunshine Boys)"

On May 4, 2017 their first group variety show  (YHBOYS' Talent Time Machine) was announced and episode zero of the show was aired on Yinyuetai the next day.

On May 19, 2017 Billboard Music Award announced that YHBOYS were invited to the 2017 BBMAs' Magenta Carpet.

On July 10, 2017 they released their fourth digital single, " (Magic Fun Land)", which is also their last high-budget music video ever. 
YHBoys seemed to become more and more successful, and was without a doubt the new rising boy group in the music industry.

Filmography

Dramas

Web Films

Films

Music videos

References 

Musical groups established in 2017
Chinese boy bands
Chinese pop music groups
Mandopop musical groups
2017 establishments in China
Yuehua Entertainment artists